Howland Fish (December 1786 – June 21, 1862) was an American legislator and lawyer.

He was born in Dutchess County, New York. He graduated from Yale College in 1809.  He studied law with the late Philip Parker of Hudson, New York, and pursued the profession with success in Johnstown, Glen, and Fultonville.  He represented Montgomery County, New York, three times in the New York State Legislature, was an active member of the Constitutional Convention of 1820, and in later years held the office of District Attorney.  He died at Fultonville, New York, aged 75.

External links
 

1786 births
1862 deaths
People from Dutchess County, New York
Yale College alumni
New York (state) lawyers
Members of the New York State Assembly
19th-century American politicians
19th-century American lawyers